The 2016–17 Villanova Wildcats men's basketball team represented Villanova University in the 2016–17 NCAA Division I men's basketball season. Led by head coach Jay Wright in his 16th year, the Wildcats participated in the Big East Conference and played their home games at The Pavilion, with some select home games at the Wells Fargo Center in Philadelphia, Pennsylvania. They finished the season 32–4, 15–3 in Big East play to win the regular season championship. In the Big East tournament, they defeated St. John's, Seton Hall, and Creighton to win the tournament championship. As a result, they received the conference's automatic bid to the NCAA tournament. The Wildcats were given the Tournament's overall No. 1 seed as a No. 1 seed in the East region. In the First Round they defeated Mount St. Mary's before being upset by No. 8-seeded Wisconsin in the Second Round. The loss marked the second time in the previous three tournaments that Villanova was upset by an eighth-seeded team.

The season marked the final season for The Pavilion before its temporary closure for a $60 million renovation project. It will reopen for the 2018–19 season with the new name of Finneran Pavilion after a Villanova alum who donated $22.6 million to Villanova. Accordingly, all home games for the 2017–18 season will be played at the Wells Fargo Center.

Previous season
The Wildcats finished the 2015–16 season with a record of 35–5, 16–2 in Big East play to win the Big East regular season championship. In the Big East tournament they defeated Georgetown and Providence, but lost to Seton Hall in the championship game. The Wildcats received an at-large bid to the NCAA tournament, being awarded the No. 2 seed in the South Region. Villanova defeated UNC Asheville and Iowa to advance to the Sweet Sixteen. In the Sweet Sixteen, they defeated Miami and upset overall No. 1 seed Kansas in the Elite Eight to advance to the fifth Final Four in school history. In the Final Four, the Wildcats defeated Oklahoma to advance to the school's third National Championship game. In the National Championship game, they defeated No. 1 seed North Carolina to earn the second NCAA Championship title in school history, the first since 1985.

Offseason

Departures

2016 signing class

Future recruits

2017–18 team recruits

Preseason 
Prior to the season, Villanova was picked to win the Big East in a poll of Big East coaches. Josh Hart was named preseason Big East Player of the Year. Kris Jenkins was named to the All-Big East first team and Jalen Brunson received an Honorable Mention.

Roster

Schedule and results

|-
!colspan=9 style="background:#; color:#;"| Exhibition

|-
!colspan=12 style=""| Non-conference regular season

|-

|-
!colspan=9 style="text-align: center; background:#"|Big East tournament

 

|-
!colspan=12 style=| NCAA tournament

Rankings

*AP does not release post-NCAA tournament rankings

Honors

References

External links
2016–17 Villanova Wildcats men's basketball team at ESPN

Villanova
Villanova Wildcats men's basketball seasons
Villanova
Villanova
Villanova